Arjun Sharma (born 21 May 1996) is an Indian cricketer. He made his List A debut for Services in the 2018–19 Vijay Hazare Trophy on 19 September 2018. He made his Twenty20 debut for Services in the 2018–19 Syed Mushtaq Ali Trophy on 21 February 2019. He made his first-class debut on 25 December 2019, for Services in the 2019–20 Ranji Trophy.

References

External links
 

1996 births
Living people
Indian cricketers
Services cricketers
Place of birth missing (living people)